Hospital Rock may refer to several places:

Hospital Rock (Tulelake, California)
Hospital Rock (Three Rivers, California), located in Sequoia National Park
Hospital Rock (Oahu, Hawaii)